Theodore Roosevelt "Hound Dog" Taylor (April 12, 1915 – December 17, 1975) was a Chicago blues guitarist and singer.

Life and career
Taylor was born in Natchez, Mississippi, in 1915, though some sources say 1917. He first played the piano and began playing the guitar when he was 20. He moved to Chicago in 1942.

Taylor had a condition known as polydactylism, which resulted in him having six fingers on both hands. As is usual with the condition, the extra digits were rudimentary nubbins and could not be moved. One night, while drunk, he cut off the extra digit on his right hand using a straight razor.

He became a full-time musician around 1957, but remained unknown outside the Chicago area, where he played small clubs in black neighborhoods and at the open-air Maxwell Street Market. He was known for his electrified slide guitar playing (roughly styled after that of Elmore James), his cheap Japanese Teisco guitars, and his raucous boogie beats. In 1967, Taylor toured Europe with the American Folk Blues Festival, performing with Little Walter and Koko Taylor.

Bruce Iglauer (then a shipping clerk for Delmark Records) tried to persuade his employer to sign Taylor to a recording contract after he heard Taylor with his band, the HouseRockers (Brewer Phillips on second guitar and Ted Harvey on drums), in 1970 at Florence's Lounge on Chicago's South Side. In 1971, having no success in getting Delmark to sign Taylor, Iglauer used a $2,500 inheritance to form Alligator Records, which recorded Taylor's debut album, Hound Dog Taylor and the HouseRockers. The album was recorded in just two nights. It was the first release for Alligator, which eventually became a major blues label. Iglauer began managing and booking the band, which toured nationwide and performed with Muddy Waters, Freddie King, and Big Mama Thornton. The band became especially popular in the Boston area, where Taylor inspired the young George Thorogood. The album Live at Joe's Place documents a performance in Boston in 1972.

The second release by Taylor and his band, Natural Boogie, recorded in late 1973, received greater acclaim and led to more touring. In 1975, they toured Australia and New Zealand with Freddie King and the duo of Sonny Terry and Brownie McGhee. Taylor's third album for Alligator, Beware of the Dog, was recorded live in 1974 but was not released until after his death. Alligator also released, posthumously, Genuine Houserocking Music and Release the Hound. Bootleg live recordings also circulated after Taylor's death.

Taylor died of lung cancer in 1975. He was buried at Restvale Cemetery, in Alsip, Illinois.

Awards and recognition
In 1984, Taylor was posthumously inducted into the Blues Hall of Fame. His induction statement included: "He was not a virtuoso, nor a master technician. But the few things he could play, he could play like no one else could. He told writer Bob Neff the way he would like to be remembered: 'He couldn’t play shit, but he sure made it sound good.'"

In 1997, Alligator Records released Hound Dog Taylor: A Tribute, a 14-track tribute album in which Taylor's songs are covered by Luther Allison, Elvin Bishop, Cub Koda (with Taylor's band, the HouseRockers), Gov't Mule, Sonny Landreth, and others. A "Deluxe Edition" series compilation album followed in 1999.

A live recording by George Thorogood of Elmore James' "The Sky Is Crying" is dedicated to "the memory of the late great Hound Dog Taylor". It is included on his album Live (1986); Thorogood also recorded Taylor's "Give Me Back My Wig" for his album The Hard Stuff (2006).

Discography
Hound Dog Taylor and the HouseRockers, 1971 (Alligator Records)
Natural Boogie, 1974 (Alligator Records)
Beware of the Dog!, 1976 (Alligator Records)
Live at Florences, 1981 (JSP Records)
Genuine Houserocking Music, 1982 (Alligator Records)
Hound Dog Taylor, deluxe edition, 1999 (Alligator Records)
Release the Hound, 2004 (Alligator Records)

References

External links
Alligator Records biography of Taylor
Photo of Taylor's left hand, with six fingers

1915 births
1975 deaths
Country blues singers
Chicago blues musicians
African-American guitarists
American blues guitarists
American male guitarists
Blues musicians from Mississippi
Slide guitarists
Deaths from lung cancer
American blues singers
American blues pianists
American male pianists
20th-century American guitarists
Guitarists from Illinois
Guitarists from Mississippi
Alligator Records artists
20th-century American pianists
People with polydactyly
African-American pianists
20th-century African-American male singers
Burials at Restvale Cemetery